The Black Season EP is the debut extended play by American rapper Lex "The Hex" Master. The EP was originally released exclusively during Blaze Ya Dead Homie's The Casket Factory tour which ran from February 4, 2016 through March 13, 2016. It would later be released digitally on April 8, 2016.

It charted on the Billboard Top Independent Albums at No. 49, the Top R&B/Hip-Hop Albums at No. 40 and the Top Heatseekers Albums at No. 10.

Background
In October 2015 in the fall 2015 MNE Sampler, it was revealed that the new artist is named Lex "The Hex" Master.

In January 2016 it was announced that Lex "The Hex" Master would be going on tour with Blaze Ya Dead Homie on his The Casket Factory Tour to promote The Casket Factory. It was also announced that Lex "The Hex" Master would be releasing his debut EP on the tour titled The Black Season EP.

Promotion and release
To promote the EP, the song "Bomb On Em'" was released in October 2015.

The EP was released on The Casket Factory Tour (February 4, 2016 – March 13, 2016) and then was available for sale on Twiztid-Shop.com.

Singles
The first single from the EP was Bomb On Em and was accompanied by a music video on October 22, 2015.

On January 8, 2016 the second single from the EP was released titled Ninjas.

On September 7, 2016 the first music video from the EP for the song Raw Shit.

Track listing
"Intro" – 1:20
"Raw Shit" (featuring Monoxide Child) – 4:31
"Ninjas" –  3:51
"Bomb On Em"  – 3:07
"Anarchy" –  3:36
"The Outside" –  3:51

Personnel
Lex "The Hex" Master – performer
Paul Robert Methric – vocals (track 2), executive producer
De Elusive – producer (tracks: 1-5)
Michael "Seven" Summers – producer (track 6)
Fritz "The Cat" Vankosky – additional producer (tracks: 2, 3, 6), engineering
Rob Rebeck – mixing
Neil Simpson – mastering
James "Madrox" Spaniolo – executive producer
Eric Shetler – design
George Vhalakis – management

Charts

References

2016 debut EPs
Gangsta rap EPs
Lex "The Hex" Master albums
Majik Ninja Entertainment albums
Albums produced by Seven (record producer)